Black Magic is a 1949 film adaptation of Alexandre Dumas's novel Joseph Balsamo. It was directed by Gregory Ratoff. Set in the 18th century, the film stars Orson Welles in the lead role as Joseph Balsamo, a hypnotist, magician, and charlatan who also goes by the alias of Count Cagliostro, and Nancy Guild as Lorenza/Marie Antoinette. Akim Tamiroff has a featured role as Gitano. The film received mixed reviews.

Plot 
Alexandre Dumas, Sr. (Berry Kroeger) tells his son Alexandre Dumas, Jr. (Raymond Burr) the story of Joseph Balsamo (Orson Welles) aka Cagliostro. Through flashbacks we learn that Balsamo was a French gypsy boy who endured much hardship. He was tortured under the command of Viscount de Montaigne (Stephen Bekassy) and his parents were ordered to hang. He was rescued by some gypsies led by Gitano and swears revenge on de Montagne.

Some years later, he learns the secrets of hypnosis from Dr. Mesmer (Charles Goldner). Ignoring the doctor's advice that he use his powers for healing, he exploits his new talent to the full, gaining wealth, fame and prestige. After changing his name to Count Cagliostro, he becomes famous throughout Europe.

Things begin to go downhill when he enters a plot to substitute a young girl called Lorenza (Nancy Guild) for Queen Marie Antoinette along with gypsies Gitano (Akim Tamiroff) and Zoraida (Valentina Cortese). The plot is organised by de Montaigne in association with Madame du Barry. They plan for Lorenza to impersonate the Queen and buy a frivolous necklace.

Zoraida becomes jealous of Lorenza, who has fallen under Cagliostro's power, forgetting her true love, Gilbert. Gilbert runs away with Lorenza. Cagliostro recaptures her and marries her, hypnotised.

King Louis XV dies and Marie Antoinette becomes queen. She orders Cagliostro to leave the country. Cagliostro gets Lorenza to impersonate the Queen and pretend to be in love with de Montaigne. He buys the necklace and the Queen's reputation is damaged (true Affair of the Diamond Necklace).

Zoraida brings Lorenza to Marie Antoinette and reveals Cagliostro's plot. Lorenza agrees to testify against Cagliostro, but at the trial, Cagliostro hypnotizes her into stating that she knows nothing. Cagliostro hypnotizes Gilbert into testifying against the queen.

However, Dr. Mesmer then uses the necklace to hypnotize Cagliostro into confessing. Cagliostro awakens from his trance and escapes with the hypnotized Lorenza. Gilbert pursues them and kills Cagliostro in a sword fight.

Cast  

 Orson Welles as Joseph Balsamo a.k.a. Count Cagliostro
 Nancy Guild as Marie Antoinette / Lorenza
 Akim Tamiroff as Gitano
 Frank Latimore as Captain Gilbert de Rezel
 Valentina Cortese as Zoraida
 Margot Grahame as Madame du Barry
 Stephen Bekassy as Viscount de Montaigne
 Berry Kroeger as Alexandre Dumas, Sr.
 Gregory Gaye as Chambord / Monk
 Raymond Burr as Alexandre Dumas, Jr.
 Charles Goldner as Dr. Franz Anton Mesmer
 Lee Kresel as King Louis XVI / Innkeeper
 Robert Atkins as King Louis XV
 Nicholas Bruce as De Remy
 Franco Corsaro as Chico
 Annielo Mele as Joseph Balsamo, as a child
 Ronald Adam as Court President
 Bruce Belfrage as Crown Prosecutor
 Alexander Danaroff as Dr. Duval / Baron von Minden
 Leonardo Scavino as Gaston / Beniamino Balsamo
 Tamara Shayne as Maria Balsamo
 Joop van Hulzen as Minister of Justice
 Peter Trent as Dr. Mesmer's Friend
 Giuseppe Varni as Boehmer
 Tatyana Pavlova as The mother

Production
The movie was originally known as Cagliostro. Producer Edward Small went through a number of directors and stars in trying to get this film off the ground, starting in 1943. Charles Boyer was to star with Akim Tamiroff, and Irving Pichel directing, then in early 1944 J. Carrol Naish was reported to play Alexandre Dumas, Sr.  Later that year, George Sanders was announced as the star with Douglas Sirk directing. Louis Hayward was also at one stage announced to star.

In 1943 Hedda Hopper suggested Orson Welles should play the lead role. He signed in September 1947.

In 1947, Small was to make the film in Mexico, but dropped those plans when it turned out to be more expensive to shoot there than he expected – so the location of shooting was changed to Italy, where Small could use blocked lira. Small borrowed Gregory Ratoff, Frank Latimore  and Nancy Guild from Twentieth Century-Fox and took over the Scalera studios in Rome from early October 1947 to late January 1948.

Charles Bennett, who wrote the script, said José Ferrer was supposed to play the lead but he demanded a three-picture contract from Small who refused. Bennett later said Ratoff and Welles rewrote the film, but he admired Welles' performance.

Orson Welles said Small ("no mean master of suggestion, by the way") approached him "very cleverly with the role of Cagliostro. He waited 'til I had reread the Dumas novels and become so 'hypnotised' by the scoundrel that I felt I had to play him. Then Small announced casually, 'Gregory Ratoff is going to direct'. That cinched it. Gregory is a great friend, and more fun to work with than anybody I know."

United Artists were so enthusiastic about the film they agreed to distribute the film for 25% of the profits as opposed to their usual fee of 27.5%.
Welles allegedly directed several scenes in the film, which was released on 18 August 1949.

Reception
Reviews were mixed.

The 2006 film Fade to Black has Welles (Danny Huston) involved in a murder mystery while in Rome for the production of Black Magic.

References

External links 
 
 
 
 
 

1949 films
American black-and-white films
1940s English-language films
Films directed by Gregory Ratoff
Films directed by Orson Welles
Films based on French novels
Films based on works by Alexandre Dumas
Films set in France
Films set in the 18th century
Films about Marie Antoinette
Works about Alessandro Cagliostro
Works about the Affair of the Diamond Necklace
Works about Louis XV
Films about hypnosis
Films about Romani people
Films about Alessandro Cagliostro
Cultural depictions of Madame du Barry
Cultural depictions of Louis XV
Cultural depictions of Louis XVI
United Artists films
Films scored by Paul Sawtell
Films with screenplays by Richard Schayer